Leacy Naylor Green-Leach (1862-1937) was a poet and editor.

Early life 
Green-Leach was born in 1862 in Culpeper County, Virginia.  Her parents were James Williams Green and Ann Sanford McDonald.  Through her father’s side Green-Leach was descended from George Mason, one of the authors of the Bill of Rights.  Green attended private schools in Virginia until enrolling in Hellmuth Ladies' College in London, Ontario.  Green-Leach graduated with honors at age 16.

Later life 
In 1888 Green-Leach married James Madison Leach Jr.  The couple had two children, Marcia Lewis Leach and James Green Leach.  Green-Leach was the founder and editor of The Circle, a literary magazine based in Baltimore that operated from 1923 to 1938.  1923 was also the year that Green-Leach founded the American Poetry Circle, a Baltimore literary society.  In 1925, Green-Leach joined Gertrude P. West and Edwin Markham in founding Poetic Thrills, a poetry magazine.  Green-Leach’s poetry was published in books such as The Independent Poetry Anthology and One Man and a Dream.  Green-Leach passed away on March 12, 1937.

References 

1862 births
1937 deaths
People from Culpeper County, Virginia
American women poets
Poets from Virginia
19th-century American poets
20th-century American poets
20th-century American women writers
19th-century American women